Octavian "Tavi" Grigore (15 July 1964) is a Romanian professional football manager and former player.

Playing career
Born in Urlați, Prahova County, Grigore played as a centre-back and spent his entire career at nearby team Petrolul Ploiești. He amassed totals of 519 matches and 74 goals during his 19 years with "the Yellow Wolves".

Managerial career
Following his retirement as a player, Grigore started his managerial career by coaching teams such as Unirea Urziceni, FCM Târgoviște or Dunărea Galați among others, but also returning to Petrolul Ploiești for several stints.

Honours

Player
Petrolul Ploiești
Divizia B: 1981–82, 1984–85, 1988–89
Cupa României: 1994–95

Manager
Petrolul Ploiești
Divizia B: 2002–03
Liga IV – Prahova County: 2016–17

See also
List of one-club men

References

External links
 
 

1964 births
Living people
People from Urlați
Romanian footballers
Romania under-21 international footballers
Association football midfielders
Liga I players
Liga II players
Liga I managers
Liga II managers
FC Petrolul Ploiești players
Romanian football managers
FC Petrolul Ploiești managers
FC Unirea Urziceni managers